The 1912 United States presidential election in Delaware took place on November 5, 1912, as part of the 1912 United States presidential election. State voters chose three representatives, or electors, to the Electoral College, who voted for president and vice president.

Delaware was won by Princeton University President Woodrow Wilson (D–Virginia), running with governor of Indiana Thomas R. Marshall, with 46.48% of the popular vote, against the 27th president of the United States William Howard Taft (R–Ohio), running with Columbia University President Nicholas Murray Butler, with 32.85% of the popular vote and the 26th president of the United States Theodore Roosevelt (P–New York), running with governor of California Hiram Johnson, with 18.25% of the popular vote.

Delaware was the only state where the Prohibition Party received fourth place with 1.28% of the popular vote which was ahead of the Socialist Eugene V. Debs who only received 1.14% of the vote.

Results

See also
 United States presidential elections in Delaware

References

Delaware
1912
1912 Delaware elections